Spiridione Gopcevich (Cyrillic: Спиридон Гопчевић, 1815-1861) was  a shipowner from Trieste.

Biography
Gopchevich was of Serbian origin. His father, Christopher Gopcevich (Hristifor Gopcevic), born in 1765, originated from the village of Podi near Herceg Novi, in Boka Kotorska (modern Montenegro), was also a shipowner who moved from Montenegro with three brigadiers to Trieste in 1805, attracted by the city's explosive growth and earning potential. Spiridone's mother was Sofia Kvekich (Herceg Novi 1792 - Trieste 1854) related to the Trieste shipping magnate Marko Kvekić.

Spiridione  was sent to Vienna to be educated. He spoke fluently thirteen languages and become a great shipowner in Trieste, then Austrian Littoral (modern Italy) and in Odessa, Imperial Russia. After attending universities abroad, upon his return to Trieste, he proceeded to improve his father's trade business. When his father died in the middle of the 19th century, Spiridone Gopcevich owned 33 sailing ships and 2 steamships. which was about 10% of the tonnage of all merchant ships registered in Trieste, the main port of Austria. His ships sailed to the Russian Black Sea ports with which he did lucrative business.

His ships traded on the Mediterranean and the Black Sea routes, and he knew many dignitaries of the time, namely the British Prime Minister William Gladstone and the revolutionary Giuseppe Garibaldi whom he helped with the transport of military and humanitarian aid. 

He then built the family palace (1850) on the Canal Grande in Trieste, partially copying the decoration on the façade of the Venetian Palazzo Ducale, designed by his architect - Giovanni Andrea Berlam. Aware of his Serbian origin, he decorated the facade with four sculptures representing the heroes of the Battle of Kosovo (1389); Empress Milica, Tsar Lazar, Miloš Obilić and an anonymous Kosovo girl who helps the wounded. The palace still bears his surname, but today it houses a museum.

At that time he was also a prominent member of the Illyrian community, as Serbian societies in Austria were called at the time, and was elected its president three times (1847, 1851 and 1854).

At the peak of his career, he was ruined by the business of importing Russian grain, for which he took out a large loan in Vienna. As the Crimean War was planned at that time, the grain remained blocked in the Black Sea ports, and he could not deliver it to Trieste even with great urgencies and letters to acquaintances - so he went bankrupt, and shortly afterwards killed himself in 1861.

Spiridone was an active member of the Serbian Orthodox community of Trieste - Saint Spyridon. In addition, he was a benefactor who helped not only the institutions of Trieste but also those from his old, original homeland. In 1852 when a disaster hit the region, he helped the people of Sarajevo, and refugees from Herzegovina in general.

His son Spiridon Gopčević (1855 - 1928) was a journalist and world-famous astronomer, and his grandson Marino Gopcevich (1899 - 1965), a neurologist, who in 1945 founded the neurology department of the hospital in Trieste.

Another illustrious descendant of the family was Marino Gopcevich (1899-1965), a neurologist, who in 1945 founded the Neurological division of the General Hospital in Trieste.

Gopcevich built the Palazzo Gopcevich in Trieste.

See also
Triestine Serbs
Serbs in Italy
Serbian diaspora
Spiridon Gopčević
Marino Gopcevich

References

Businesspeople from Trieste
Italian businesspeople in shipping
People from Austrian Littoral
1815 births
1861 deaths
19th-century Italian businesspeople